Happiness Never Comes Alone is a 2012 French romantic comedy film directed by James Huth and starring Gad Elmaleh, Sophie Marceau, and Maurice Barthélémy. Written by James Huth and Sonja Shillito, the film is about a young jazz musician who enjoys seducing young women. His carefree life of pleasure is interrupted when he meets an older woman with three children, two ex-husbands, and a thriving professional life, and the two, who have nothing in common, become involved in a romantic relationship.

Plot
Sacha (Gad Elmaleh) is a talented jazz pianist who does not take life too seriously. He loves his friends, his piano, and he loves to party. At night, he plays in a jazz club and enjoys seducing pretty young girls. He lives for the moment, looking for pleasure, with no responsibility, no family, and no taxes. Sacha's carefree life changes suddenly when he meets a forty-something career woman named Charlotte (Sophie Marceau) one rainy afternoon. After they make love, Sacha discovers that Charlotte has three children, not to mention a jealous soon-to-be ex-husband who runs the multinational company they both work for. Although she no longer loves her husband, she has a hard time untying the knot because of his wealth and power. Sacha and Charlotte have seemingly nothing in common, but they may just be made for each other.

Cast
 Gad Elmaleh as Sacha
 Sophie Marceau as Charlotte
  as Laurent
 François Berléand as Alain Posche
 Michaël Abiteboul as Lionel
 Julie-Anne Roth as Chris
 Macha Méril as Fanfan Keller
 François Vincentelli as César
 Timéo Leloup as Léonard
 Milena Chiron as Suzy
 Timothé Gauron as Louis
 Litzi Vezsi as Mamie Matzü
 Cyril Guei as Xavier
 Bérénice Marlohe as Laurent's date

Production
Happiness Never Comes Alone was filmed on location in Paris and New York City. Scenes were shot in Parc Monceau, Paris 8. Principal photography took place from 17 May to 29 July 2011.

Reception
The film received generally positive reviews. In his review in Variety, Boyd van Hoeij called it a "glossy romantic comedy filled with amusing pratfalls and palpable chemistry." Noting that the film explores the problems of beginning a new relationship while raising children, Hoeij goes on to write:

Evoking the classic Hollywood screwball comedies, the film "finds just the right balance between his and her perspectives, while the actors breathe life into their slightly clichéd characters by keeping things low-key and affable, displaying enough chemistry to have auds root for them against all odds."

In her review on the Urban Cinefile website, Louise Keller wrote, "Like a good piece of jazz that surprises by its melodies, harmonies and rhythms, this delectable comedy mixes up music, art, kids and love in surprising juxtapositions, delivering a vibrant splash of life. ... Elmaleh and Marceau carry the film with their style, charisma and chemistry in this feel-good breezy encounter." Also on Urban Cinefile, Andrew L. Urban felt the movie was "blessed with a soundtrack showing impeccable taste" and that the "establishing scenes are the best things about the film, as it shows its heart on its sleeve, turning on the magic realism charm, seducing us with its overt romanticism and letting us feast on two characters falling madly in love."

References

External links
 
 
 

2012 films
2012 romantic comedy films
Films shot in New York City
Films shot in Paris
French romantic comedy films
Films directed by James Huth
Films scored by Bruno Coulais
2010s French films